Her Excellency Maitha Saif Majid Al Mahrouqi,  is an Omani businesswoman and politician, who is the Undersecretary for Tourism in Oman.

Biography 
Al Mahrouqi studied at Oxford Brookes University. In 1999 she was the first woman from the Gulf to region to gain a BSc in Cartography, this was awarded by the UK Board of Cartography. She also earned an MA in marketing from the University of Hull. Her career began in the aviation sector. She has worked for Emirates Airlines, as well as Gulf Air. In 2010 she was appointed Country Manager for Oman Air. In 2011 she was appointed as the Undersecretary for Tourism for the Government of Oman. In 2016 she was awarded the Golden Shield of Excellence for the Tourism Sector from Arab Women's Council. She was also the vice-chair for the National Aviation Group of Oman's board of directors.

References 

Omani politicians
Omani women
Living people
Tourism in Oman
Year of birth missing (living people)
21st-century Omani women politicians
21st-century Omani politicians
Women government ministers of Oman
Alumni of Oxford Brookes University
Alumni of the University of Hull